Belbury Castle is the name given to an Iron Age earthwork, probably a hill fort or livestock enclosure, close to Ottery St Mary in Devon, England.

The ancient site was known as 'bigulfesburh' or Beowulf's burgh.

References

Hill forts in Devon